Lucile may refer to:
Lucile (poem), an 1860 story in verse By Owen Meredith (Robert, Lord Lytton-Bulwer Though the book in Question makes reference to the name Bulwer.
Lucile, the couture house (and nickname) of early 20th-century fashion designer Lucy, Lady Duff-Gordon
Lucile (opera), a 1769 opera by André Grétry
Lucile (film), a 1927 French silent drama film

People
Lucile, pen name of Lucinda Barbour Helm (1839–1897), American author
Lucile Abreu (1920–1996), American police detective
Lucile Adams-Campbell (born 1953), American epidemiologist
Lucile Allorge (born 1937), Madagascar-born French botanist
Lucile Atcherson Curtis (1894–1986), American diplomatic service officer
Lucile Blanch (1895–1981), American painter
Lucile Bluford (1911–2003), American journalist and philanthropist
Lucile Browne (1907–1976), American film actress
Lucile Buchanan (1884–1989), American educator
Lucile Carter (1875–1934), American socialite and RMS Titanic survivor
Lucile Council (1898–1964), American landscape designer
Lucile Cypriano (born 1996), French racing driver
Lucile Desmoulins (1770–1794), French revolutionary, diarist, and author
Lucile Eaves (1869–1953), American sociologist, university professor, and activist
Lucile Eleanor St. Hoyme (1924–2001), American biological anthropologist
Lucile Fairbanks (1917–1999), American actress
Lucile Garner (1910–2013), Canadian flight attendant and nurse
Lucile Gleason (1888–1947), American stage and screen actress
Lucile Godbold (1900–1981), American track and field athlete
Lucile Grahn (1819–1907), Danish ballerina
Lucile Grétry (1772–1790), French composer
Lucile Hac (1909–2006), American biochemist and microbiologist
Lucile Hadžihalilović (born 1961), French writer and film director of Bosnian descent
Lucile Henriette Mondutaigny (1826–1901), French singer
Lucile Land Lacy (1901–1994), American painter and printmaker
Lucile Lawrence (1907–2004), American harpist
Lucile Lefevre (born 1995), French snowboarder
Lucile Lloyd (1894–1941), American muralist, illustrator, and decorative painter
Lucile Lomen (1920–1996), American law clerk
Lucile M. Morsch (1906–1972), American librarian
Lucile Morat (born 2001), French ski jumper
Lucile Nix (1903–1968), American librarian
Lucile P. Hicks (born 1938), American politician
Lucile Quarry Mann (1897–1986), American writer, editor, and explorer
Lucile Randon (1904–2023), French supercentenarian
Lucile Saint-Simon (born 1932), French actress
Lucile Saunders McDonald (1898–1992), American journalist, historian, and author
Lucile Sayers (1887–1959), American-British political activist
Lucile Schmid (born 1962), French politician
Lucile Swan (1887–1965), American sculptor and artist
Lucile Tessariol (born 2004), French swimmer
Lucile Watson (1879–1962), Canadian-born American actress
Lucile A. Watts (1920–2018), American judge
Lucile Wheeler (born 1935), Canadian former alpine ski racer

Places
In the United States
 Lucile, Georgia
 Lucile, Idaho
 Lucile, West Virginia

See also
Lucille (disambiguation)
Lucia (disambiguation)